The 2002 French Community Championships was a women's tennis tournament played on outdoor clay courts in Brussels, Belgium that was part of the Tier IV category of the 2002 WTA Tour. It was the ninth and last edition of the tournament and was held from 8 July until 14 July 2002. Unseeded Myriam Casanova won the singles title and the accompanying $22,000 first-prize money.

Finals

Singles

 Myriam Casanova defeated  Arantxa Sánchez Vicario, 4–6, 6–2, 6–1
 It was Casanova's only singles title of her career.

Doubles

 Barbara Schwartz /  Jasmin Wöhr defeated  Tathiana Garbin /  Arantxa Sánchez Vicario, 6–2, 0–6, 6–4

External links
 ITF tournament edition details
 Tournament draws

Antwerp
WTA Knokke-Heist
French Community Championships
French Community Championships
French Community Championships